Gerard Bi Goua Gohou (born 29 December 1988) is a footballer. Born in the Ivory Coast, he plays for the Rwanda national team.

Career

JC Abidjan
Gohou began his career 2004 with JC Abidjan and in 2008 appeared in the first team which played in the Ivory Coast's top tier. He served a total of four years with JC Abidjan.

Hassania Agadir
In summer 2008 Gohou signed for Moroccan club HUS d'Agadir. Gohou scored nine goals in 17 matches for the club.

Neuchâtel Xamax
On 15 February 2010, Swiss Super League club Neuchâtel Xamax announced the signing of Gohou. Shortly afterwards, Moroccan media suggested his contract with former side Hassania Agadir had not been terminated. On 27 February 2017, he arrived in Neuchâtel and was presented by his new club. Hassania Agadir contested the termination of the contract with Gohou and reported the case to FIFA. Moroccan authorities had arrested Gohou at the airport and held him in custody for three days before being acquitted of a theft charge, according to the player.

Gohou played the second half of the 2010–11 and after failing to score in the first ten matches, he scored a brace in the last match of his first season at the club.

He netted six goals in the first 13 league matches of the 2011–12 season. In the following 17 league matches he played he scored two goals.

Across one and a half seasons Gohou totalled nine goals in 41 league matches.

Denizlispor
In July 2011, Gohou joined Turkish second-tier side Denizlispor on a three-year contract.

FC Krasnodar
On 5 July 2013, Gohou signed a three-year contract with Russian Premier League club FC Krasnodar.

FC Kairat
On 24 June 2014, Krasnodar announced that Gohou had left the club to sign for FC Kairat of the Kazakhstan Premier League, on a six-month contract. On 30 July 2015, Gohou extended his stay at Kairat until December 2017.

On 13 November 2017, Kairat announced that Gohou would be leaving the club at the end of his contract.

Beijing Enterprises Group
On 5 February 2018, Gohou joined China League One club Beijing Enterprises Group.

Kasımpaşa
On 20 January 2020, Kasımpaşa announced the signing of Gohou on an initial 18-month contract, with the option of an additional two-years.

International career
Gohou was born in the Ivory Coast and is of Ivorian descent. He was a member of the Ivory Coast national under-23 football team and scored twice on his debut on 20 May 2010 against Colombia national under-23 football team in the 2010 Toulon Tournament. 

In 2017, Gohou was coached by Spanish manager Carlos Alós in Kazakhstani club FC Kairat. Five years later, the Spaniard took the Rwanda national team and contacted him to represent Rwanda. After being given a Rwandan passport, he was called up for a set of friendlies in September 2022. He debuted with Rwanda in a friendly 0–0 tie with Equatorial Guinea on 23 September 2022. He had previously rejected to represent Benin.

Statistics

Club

Honours

Club
FC Kairat
 Kazakhstan Cup: 2014, 2015, 2017
 Kazakhstan Super Cup: 2016, 2017

Individual
 Botola Top Scorer: 2008–09
 TFF First League Top Scorer: 2012–13
 Kazakhstan Premier League Top Scorer: 2015, 2016, 2017

References

External links

1988 births
Living people

Rwandan footballers
Rwanda international footballers
Ivorian footballers
Association football defenders
Neuchâtel Xamax FCS players
Ivorian expatriate sportspeople in Switzerland
Hassania Agadir players
Ivorian expatriate sportspeople in Morocco
JC d'Abidjan players
Denizlispor footballers
Kayseri Erciyesspor footballers
Ivorian expatriate sportspeople in Turkey
FC Krasnodar players
FC Kairat players
Beijing Sport University F.C. players
Kasımpaşa S.K. footballers
Swiss Super League players
TFF First League players
Russian Premier League players
Kazakhstan Premier League players
China League One players
Ivorian expatriate footballers
Expatriate footballers in Morocco
Expatriate footballers in Switzerland
Expatriate footballers in Turkey
Expatriate footballers in Russia
Expatriate footballers in Kazakhstan
Expatriate footballers in China
People from Gagnoa